Anthonie Rouwenhorst Mulder  (28 April 1848 – 6 March 1901) was a Dutch engineer and foreign advisor specializing in hydraulic engineering in Meiji period Empire of Japan.

Mulder was born in Leiden, Kingdom of the Netherlands as the son of a tobacco trader. He obtained his degree as a civil engineer from what is now TU Delft in 1872.

After graduation, Mulder served as a supervisor of water management on the River Waal at Herwijnen. However, after only one year, he was invited by Prince Henry, the son of King William II to establish a trading post at the northern entrance to the Suez Canal, near Port Said in Egypt. Although his contemporaries advised against the venture, Mulder lived in Egypt from August 1873 to August 1876, and built the main house, a warehouse, a coal shed, a goods shed, service residences, two piers and the foundation for a water reservoir as well as a hotel. The trading post proved commercially successful, but the venture was terminated with the unexpected death of Prince Henry in 1876.

Mulder returned to the Netherlands, where he built the Change Canal in The Hague, as well as a steam-powered tramway in Haarlem.

Mulder was then recruited by the government of Japan in late 1879. He was responsible for improvements to the course of the Tone River, Kinugawa River, Fuji River, Yodo River and the Sumida River; however, in Japan he became known as a specialist in the redesign and improvements of ports and harbours. In addition to Port of Tokyo, where access had previously been hampered by large mudbanks, he also worked on ports in Okayama, Hiroshima, Hachinohe and Shimonoseki. His contemporaries in Japan included Cornelis Johannes van Doorn and Johannis de Rijke and George Arnold Escher.

After his contract expired in 1890, he returned to the Hague. In 1897 he returned to the Netherland, and designed a system of steam-powered tram lines in Nijmegen. He died in Nijmegen in 1901.

References 
 Gasteren, L.A. van e.a. (red.), In een Japanse stroomversnelling: berichten van Nederlandse watermannen – rijswerkers, ingenieurs, werkbazen – 1872-1903, Amsterdam; Zutphen: Euro Book Productions/Walburg Pers, 2000.
von Graaf, Rutger. Urban Water in Japan CRC Press, 2008,

External links 
 Anthonie Thomas Lubertus Rouwenhorst Mulder, Johan Christoffel Ramaer in het Nieuw Nederlands Biografisch Woordenboek (NNBW)

Notes

1848 births
1901 deaths
People from Leiden
Dutch expatriates in Japan
Dutch civil engineers
Foreign advisors to the government in Meiji-period Japan